Kikkeri Subbarao Narasimhaswamy (26 January 1915 – 27 December 2003) commonly known as K. S. Narasimhaswamy, was an Indian poet who wrote in Kannada language. His most popular collection of poems, Mysooru Mallige, has seen more than thirty-two reprints and is sometimes given to newly married couples in Karnataka. Narasimhaswamy is a recipient of the Sahitya Akademi Award, Kannada sahitya Academy Award, and the Asian Prize for literature.

Early life
Narasimhaswamy was born in Kikkeri in Mandya district. He abandoned studies after his father, who wanted him to become an engineer, died, and took up a job of a clerk in a municipal office in Mysore. However, in 1934, he joined the Central College in Bangalore, where he obtained a Bachelor of Arts degree. He was transferred to Bangalore in 1954 and retired as a superintendent in the Karnataka Housing Board in the 1970s. He married Venkamma in Tiptur in 1936. He often portrayed his wife as the inspiration for his poems which mainly deal with romance in married life.

Works
Narasimhaswamy's romantic love poems, inspired by Robert Burns (whose work he translated to Kannada as Robert Burnsna Premageetegalu) were unique to the language at the time when most Kannada poetry dealt with nature and the natural world.

Publications

Poetry collections
 Mysooru Mallige  (1942)
 Ungura           (1942)
 Airaavatha       (1945)
 Deepada Malli    (1947)
 Iruvanthige      (1952)
 Shilaalathe      (1958)
 Maneyinda Manege (1960)
 Tereda Baagilu   (1976)
 Navapallava      (1983)
 Malligeya Maale  (1986,2004)
 Dundu Mallige    (1993)
 Navila Dani      (1999)
 Sanje Haadu      (2000)
 Kaimarada Nelalalli    (2001)
 Ede Thumba Nakshtra    (2002)
 Mounadali Maatha Hudukutha (2003)
 Deepa Saalina Naduve (2003)
 Haadu-Hase  (A Collection of songs)   (2003)
 Ikkala
 Dandu Mallige

Translations
 Media (1966)
 Robert Burns Kaviya kelavu Premageetegalu (1997)
 Kelavu Chinee Kavanagalu (1997)

Prose
 Maariya Kallu  (1942)
 Upavana        (1958)
 Damayanthi     (1960)
 Sirimallige    (1990)

References

1915 births
2003 deaths
Kannada poets
People from Mandya district
Recipients of the Sahitya Akademi Award in Kannada
20th-century Indian poets
Indian male poets
Poets from Karnataka
20th-century Indian male writers
Best Lyrics National Film Award winners